Ghosts of Girlfriends Past is a 2009 American romantic comedy film directed by Mark Waters. The script was written by Jon Lucas and Scott Moore, based on Charles Dickens' 1843 novella A Christmas Carol. Filming spanned February 19, 2008 to July 2008 in Rhode Island with stars Matthew McConaughey, Jennifer Garner, Lacey Chabert, Emma Stone, and Michael Douglas. The film was released on May 1, 2009.

Ghosts of Girlfriends Past features a wedding day and the day before, rather than the familiar Christmas and Christmas Eve from A Christmas Carol. The three ghosts share similar appearances with the original descriptions, and the film shares the traditional plot points from the book.

Plot
Connor Mead is a famous photographer and womanizer. After breaking up with three women simultaneously on a conference call to save time, he travels to his late uncle Wayne's estate to attend the wedding of his brother Paul to Sandra. There, he becomes reacquainted with Jenny Perotti, the only girl who captured his heart. After delivering a drunken speech at the rehearsal dinner, Connor is visited by the ghost of the inveterate playboy Wayne, who warns Connor that he will be visited by three ghosts who will lead him through his romantic past, present, and future.

The first is the "Ghost of Girlfriends Past" in the form of Allison, his first lover. They revisit scenes from his past, focusing on his relationship with Jenny. She and Connor were very close at school; she gave him his first instant camera which he used to take her picture, promising to keep it forever. By middle school, they were on the verge of romance, but Connor's hesitation at a dance caused Jenny to dance with and kiss another boy.

Wayne advised a heartbroken Connor to avoid romance at all costs in order not to feel such pain again, and began to teach him his techniques as a pickup artist. When he next saw Jenny, he ignored her in favor of Allison. Several years later, Connor and Jenny met again and rekindled their romance. After spending the night together, Connor realized that he was falling in love and panicked, leaving Jenny to wake up alone and broken-hearted.

Back in the present, Connor accidentally destroys the wedding cake and fails to reconcile with Jenny. He is confronted by the "Ghost of Girlfriends Present" in the form of his assistant Melanie, who shows him the other members of the wedding party making fun of his shallow lifestyle. Paul expresses hope that he will someday improve, while Jenny is being comforted by Brad, which upsets Connor. Melanie and his newly-jilted trio of lovers discuss his lack of empathy.

Sandra hears of Connor's accidental revelation that Paul slept with one of her bridesmaids early in their relationship, and furiously confronts Paul. A returned Connor attempts to mend the situation, but Paul tells him to leave. He is visited by the "Ghost of Girlfriends Future", who takes him forward in time to see that Jenny marries Brad while Paul remains alone. Further in the future, Paul is the only mourner at Connor's funeral. Wayne appears and tells Connor that this is his fate if he continues on the same path, pushing him into the grave to be buried by his many ex-girlfriends.

Waking up in bed, Connor is relieved to find it is early on the day of the wedding, but discovers that Sandra has called it off and departed. Intercepting her car, Connor convinces her to forgive Paul, saying that the pain of heartbreak is outweighed by the regret of never risking one's heart in the first place. At the restored festivities--where he serves as wedding photographer--Connor reconciles with Jenny by showing her the picture he still carries of her. They kiss and dance in the snow to the same song Connor once hesitated to ask her to dance to.

His work complete, Uncle Wayne strikes out with the Ghost of Girlfriends Future, tries to hit on Melanie before her corporeally-present counterpart dances with Brad, and is finally rejected by Allison, the Ghost of Girlfriends Past, who still appears 16.

Cast
 Matthew McConaughey as Connor 'Dutch' Mead, a ladies man, is based on Ebenezer Scrooge.
 Devin Brochu as Little Connor
 Logan Miller as Young Connor
 Jennifer Garner as Jenny Perotti is based on Ebenezer Scrooge's ex-fiancée Belle.
 Kasey Russell as Little Jenny 
 Christa B. Allen as Young Jenny
 Michael Douglas as Wayne S. Mead, Connor and Paul's uncle and legal guardian, is based on Ebenezer Scrooge's business partner Jacob Marley depicted as a not-so-thinly-veiled caricature of famed Hollywood Producer Robert Evans.
 Breckin Meyer as Paul Mead, Connor's younger brother, is based on Ebenezer Scrooge's nephew Fred. 
 Lacey Chabert as Sandra Volkom, Paul Mead's fiancée
 Robert Forster as Sergeant Major Mervis Volkom
 Daniel Sunjata as Brad Frye
 Emma Stone as Allison Vandermeersh, the Ghost of Girlfriends Past
 Noureen DeWulf as Melanie, the Ghost of Girlfriends Present, is based on Bob Cratchit. 
 Olga Maliouk as the Ghost of Girlfriends Future
 Anne Archer as Vonda Volkom
 Amanda Walsh as Denice
 Camille Guaty as Donna
 Rachel Boston as Deena
 Christina Milian as Kalia
 Emily Foxler as Nadja

Production
Ghosts of Girlfriends Past was originally set up in 2004 at Touchstone Pictures with Ben Affleck attached to play the lead character and Kevin Smith to direct, but both opted out and Disney cancelled the project. Betty Thomas was also attached to direct at one point, and Affleck's LivePlanet was also on board to produce.

It was primarily filmed at Crane Castle  in Ipswich, Massachusetts. The church scene with Garner marrying another man was filmed at the Martha-Mary Chapel in Sudbury, MA. It was built by Henry Ford in honor of his mother  and mother in law. It is on the same property as the historic Wayside Inn, dating from 1716. It is the oldest operating inn in the country. The film also reunited Michael Douglas and Anne Archer for the first time since the 1987 hit thriller Fatal Attraction, but they shared no scenes together. Christa B. Allen played the younger version of Garner's character, as she did in 13 Going on 30 in 2004.

Soundtrack
"Ghosts of Girlfriends Past" - All Too Much featuring Matthew Sweet
"Hush" - Gavin Rossdale and All Too Much
"Got a Lot of Love for You Baby" - The Ralph Sall Experience
"Keep on Loving You" - REO Speedwagon
"You Can't Hurry Love" - The Ralph Sall Experience
"Ladies Night" - Kool & the Gang
"The Safety Dance" - Men Without Hats
"Yeah (Dream of Me)" - All Too Much
"Holding Back the Years" - Simply Red
"Sleep" - All Too Much

Reception

Critical reaction
The website's critics consensus reads, "A retread of A Christmas Carol, featuring Matthew McConaughey in a retread of his Dazed and Confused role, Ghosts of Girlfriends Past lacks originality, humor, and any semblance of charm." Metacritic lists it with a 34 out of 100, which indicates "generally unfavorable reviews", based on 29 reviews. Audiences polled by CinemaScore gave the film an average grade of "B" on an A+ to F scale.

Box office
On the film's opening weekend, it debuted at #2 with a gross of $15.4 million (3,175 theaters, $4,854 average), far behind X-Men Origins: Wolverines $85.1 million gross. The film made $55.3 million in the United States and Canada along with $47.1 million from foreign territories for a worldwide total of $102.4 million.

Home media
The film was released on DVD and Blu-ray on September 22, 2009.

See also
Adaptations of A Christmas Carol
List of ghost films

References

External links
 
 
 
 

2009 films
2009 romantic comedy films
2000s ghost films
Films based on A Christmas Carol
American Christmas comedy films
American fantasy comedy films
American romantic comedy films
American romantic fantasy films
Films about orphans
Films about weddings
Films about photographers
Films directed by Mark Waters
Films with screenplays by Jon Lucas and Scott Moore
Films shot in Massachusetts
2000s Christmas comedy films
Films scored by Rolfe Kent
New Line Cinema films
Warner Bros. films
2000s English-language films
2000s American films